Lori Moore (born 1990) is a student from Belfast, Northern Ireland who became the 2010 Miss Northern Ireland, the first person of black heritage to be a Miss Northern Ireland. She represented the country at Miss World 2010 being placed in the top 25.

References

1990 births
Living people
Miss Northern Ireland winners
Female models from Belfast
Miss World 2010 delegates